The 1979 European Weightlifting Championships were held in Varna, Bulgaria from May 19 to May 27, 1979. This was the 58th edition of the event. There were 140 men in action from 24 nations.

Medal summary

Medal table
Ranking by Big (Total result) medals

References
Results (Chidlovski.net)
 М. Л. Аптекарь. «Тяжёлая атлетика. Справочник.» — М.: «Физкультура и спорт», 1983. — 416 с. 

European Weightlifting Championships
European Weightlifting Championships
European Weightlifting Championships
European Weightlifting Championships
International weightlifting competitions hosted by Bulgaria
Sport in Varna, Bulgaria